Insight is the understanding of a specific cause and effect within a particular context. The term insight can have several related meanings:
a piece of information
the act or result of understanding the inner nature of things or of seeing intuitively (called noesis in Greek)
an introspection
the power of acute observation and deduction, discernment, and perception, called intellection or noesis
An understanding of cause and effect based on the identification of relationships and behaviors within a model, context, or scenario (see artificial intelligence)

An insight that manifests itself suddenly, such as understanding how to solve a difficult problem, is sometimes called by the German word Aha-Erlebnis. The term was coined by the German psychologist and theoretical linguist Karl Bühler. It is also known as an epiphany, eureka moment or (for cross word solvers) the penny dropping moment (PDM). Sudden sickening realisations often identify a problem rather than solving it, so Uh-oh rather than Aha moments are further seen in negative insight. A further example of negative insight is chagrin which is annoyance at the obviousness of a solution missed up until the point of insight, an example of this being the Homer Simpson's catchphrase exclamation, D'oh!.

Psychology

In psychology, insight occurs when a solution to a problem presents itself quickly and without warning.  It is the sudden discovery of the correct solution following incorrect attempts based on trial and error. Solutions via insight have been proven to be more accurate than non-insight solutions.

Insight was first studied by Gestalt psychology, in the early part of the 20th century, during the search for an alternative to associationism and the associationistic view of learning.  Some proposed potential mechanisms for insight include: suddenly seeing the problem in a new way, connecting the problem to another relevant problem/solution pair, releasing past experiences that are blocking the solution, or seeing problem in a larger, coherent context.

Classic methods

Generally, methodological approaches to the study of insight in the laboratory involve presenting participants with problems and puzzles that cannot be solved in a conventional or logical manner. Problems of insight commonly fall into three types.

Breaking functional fixedness

The first type of problem forces participants to use objects in a way they are not accustomed to (thus, breaking their functional fixedness), like the "Duncker candle problem". In the "Duncker candle problem", individuals are given matches and a box of tacks and asked to find a way to attach a candle to the wall to light the room. The solution requires the participants to empty the box of tacks, set the candle inside the box, tack the box to the wall, and light the candle with the matches.

Spatial ability
The second type of insight problem requires spatial ability to solve, like the "Nine-dot problem". The famous "Nine-dot problem" requires participants to draw four lines, through nine dots, without picking their pencil up.

Using verbal ability
The third and final type of problem requires verbal ability to solve, like the Remote Associates Test (RAT). In the RAT, individuals must think of a word that connects three, seemingly unrelated, words. RAT are often used in experiments, because they can be solved both with and without insight.

Specific results

Versus non-insight problems
Two clusters of problems, those solvable by insight and those not requiring insight to solve, have been observed.  An individual’s cognitive flexibility, fluency, and vocabulary ability are predictive of performance on insight problems, but not on non-insight problems. In contrast, fluid intelligence is mildly predictive of performance on non-insight problems, but not on insight problems. More recent research suggests that rather than insight versus search, that the subjective feeling of insight varies, with some solutions experienced with a stronger feeling of Aha than others.

Emotion
People in a better mood are more likely to solve problems using insight. Research demonstrated that self-reported positive affect of participants uniquely increased insight before and during the solving of a problem, as indicated by differing brain activity patterns.  People experiencing anxiety showed the opposite effect, and solved fewer problems by insight. Emotion can also be considered in terms of the insight experience and whether this is  a positive Aha or negative Uh-oh moment. Research demonstrate that in order to have insights it is important to have a good degree of access to one's own emotions and sensations, that can cause insights. To the degree that individuals have limited introspective access to these underlying causes, they have only limited control over these processes as well.

Incubation
Using a geometric and spatial insight problem, it was found that providing participants with breaks improved their performance as compared to participants who did not receive a break.  However, the length of incubation between problems did not matter. Thus, participants' performance on insight problems improved just as much with a short break (4 minutes) as it did with a long break (12 minutes).

Sleep
Research has shown sleep to help produce insight.  Individuals were initially trained on insight problems. Following training, one group was tested on the insight problems after sleeping for eight hours at night, one group was tested after staying awake all night, and one group was tested after staying awake all day. Those that slept performed twice as well on the insight problems than those who stayed awake.

In the brain

Differences in brain activation in the left and right hemisphere seem to be indicative of insight versus non-insight solutions. Using RAT’s that were either presented to the left or right visual field, it was shown that participants having solved the problem with insight were more likely to have been shown the RAT on the left visual field, indicating right hemisphere processing. This provides evidence that the right hemisphere plays a unique role in insight.

fMRI and EEG scans of participants completing RAT's demonstrated unique brain activity corresponding to problems solved by insight.  For one, there is high EEG activity in the alpha- and gamma-band about 300 milliseconds before participants indicated a solution to insight problems, but not to non-insight problems.  Additionally, problems solved by insight corresponded to increased activity in the temporal lobes and mid-frontal cortex, while more activity in the posterior cortex corresponded to non-insight problems.  The data suggests there is something different occurring in the brain when solving insight versus non-insight problems that happens right before the solving of the problem. This conclusion has been supported also by eye-tracking data which shows an increased eye blink duration and frequency when people solve problems via Insight. 
This latter result, paired with an eye pattern oriented to look away from sources of visual inputs (such as looking at blank wall, or out the window at the sky) proves different attention involvement in Insight problem solving vs problem solving via analysis.

Group insight
It was found that groups typically perform better on insight problems (in the form of rebus puzzles with either helpful or unhelpful clues) than individuals. 
 
Additionally, while incubation improves insight performance for individuals, it improves insight performance for groups even more.  Thus, after a 15-minute break, individual performance improved for the rebus puzzles with unhelpful clues, and group performance improved for rebus puzzles with both unhelpful and helpful clues.

Individual differences
Personality and gender, as they relate to performance on insight problems, was studied using a variety of insight problems.  It was found that participants who ranked lower on emotionality and higher on openness to experience performed better on insight problems. Men outperformed women on insight problems, and women outperformed men on non-insight problems.

Higher intelligence (higher IQ) has also been found to be associated with better performance on insight problems.  However, those of lower intelligence benefit more than those of higher intelligence from being provided with cues and hints for insight problems.

A recent large-scale study in Australia suggests that insight may not be universally experienced, with almost 20% of respondents reporting that they had not experienced insight.

Metacognition
Individuals are poorer at predicting their own metacognition for insight problems, than for non-insight problems. Individuals were asked to indicate how "hot" or "cold" to a solution they felt. Generally, they were able to predict this fairly well for non-insight problems, but not for insight problems.  This provides evidence for the suddenness involved during insight.

Naturalistic settings
Recently, insight was studied in a non-laboratory setting.  Accounts of insight that have been reported in the media, such as in interviews, etc., were examined and coded. It was found that insights that occur in the field are typically reported to be associated with a sudden "change in understanding" and with "seeing connections and contradictions" in the problem.  It was also found that insight in nature differed from insight in the laboratory. For example, insight in nature was often rather gradual, not sudden, and incubation was not as important. Other studies used online questionnaires to further explore insight outside of the laboratory, verifying the notion that insight often happens in situations such as in the shower, echoing the idea that creative ideas occur in situations where divergent thought is more likely, sometimes called the Three B's of Creativity, in Bed, on the Bus or in the Bath.

Non-Human Animals
Studies on primate cognition have provided evidence of what may be interpreted as insight in animals. In 1917, Wolfgang Köhler published his book The Mentality of Apes, having studied primates on the island of Tenerife for six years. In one of his experiments, apes were presented with an insight problem that required the use of objects in new and original ways, in order to win a prize (usually, some kind of food). He observed that the animals would continuously fail to get the food, and this process occurred for quite some time; however, rather suddenly, they would purposefully use the object in the way needed to get the food, as if the realization had occurred out of nowhere. He interpreted this behavior as something resembling insight in apes. A more recent study suggested that elephants might also experience insight, showing that a young male elephant was able to identify and move a large cube under food that was out of reach so that he could stand on it to get the reward.

Theories
There are a number of theories representing insight; at present, no one theory dominates interpretation.

Dual-process theory
According to the dual-process theory, there are two systems used to solve problems.  The first involves logical and analytical thought processes based on reason, while the second involves intuitive and automatic processes based on experience.  Research has demonstrated that insight probably involves both processes; however, the second process is more influential.

Three-process theory
According to the three-process theory, intelligence plays a large role in insight.  Specifically, insight involves three different processes (selective encoding, combination, and comparison), which require intelligence to apply to problems.  Selective encoding is the process of focusing attention on ideas relevant to a solution, while ignoring features that are irrelevant.  Selective combination is the process of combining the information previously deemed relevant.  Finally, selective comparison is the use of past experience with problems and solutions that are applicable to the current problem and solution.

Four-stage model
According to the four-stage model of insight, there are four stages to problem solving.  First, the individual prepares to solve a problem.  Second, the individual incubates on the problem, which encompasses trial-and-error, etc.  Third, the insight occurs, and the solution is illuminated.  Finally, the verification of the solution to the problem is experienced.  Since this model was proposed, other similar models have been explored that contain two or three similar stages.

Psychiatry

In psychology and psychiatry, insight can mean the ability to recognize one's own mental illness. Psychiatric insight is typically measured with the Beck cognitive insight scale (BCIS), named after American psychiatrist Aaron Beck. This form of insight has multiple dimensions, such as recognizing the need for treatment, and recognizing consequences of one's behavior as stemming from an illness.  A person with very poor recognition or acknowledgment is referred to as having "poor insight" or "lack of insight". The most extreme form is anosognosia, the total absence of insight into one's own mental illness.  Many mental illnesses are associated with varying levels of insight.  For example, people with obsessive compulsive disorder and various phobias tend to have relatively good insight that they have a problem and that their thoughts and/or actions are unreasonable, yet are compelled to carry out the thoughts and actions regardless.  Patients with schizophrenia, and various psychotic conditions tend to have very poor awareness that anything is wrong with them. Psychiatric insight favourably predicts outcomes in cognitive behavioural therapy for psychosis. Today some psychiatrists believe psychiatric medication may contribute to the patient's lack of insight.

Spirituality
The Pali word for "insight" is vipassana, which has been adopted as the name of a kind of Buddhist mindfulness meditation. Recent research indicates that mindfulness meditation does facilitate solving of insight problems with dosage of 20 minutes.

Marketing

Pat Conroy points out that an insight is a statement based on a deep understanding of your target consumers' attitudes and beliefs, which connect at an emotional level with your consumer, provoking a clear response (This brand understands me!  That is exactly how I feel! — even if they've never thought about it quite like that) which, when leveraged, has the power to change consumer behavior.  Insights must effect a change in consumer behavior that benefits your brand, leading to the achievement of the marketing objective.

Insights can be based on:
 Real or perceived weakness to be exploited in competitive product performance or value
 Attitudinal or perceived barrier in the minds of consumers, regarding your brand
 Untapped or compelling belief or practice

Insights are most effective when they are/do one of the following:
 Unexpected
 Create a disequilibrium
 Change momentum
 Exploited via a benefit or point of difference that your brand can deliver

In order to be actionable, as the expression of a consumer truth, an insight is to be stated as an articulated sentence, containing:
  An observation or a wish, e.g. "I would like to ...."
  A motivation explaining the wish, e.g. " because ..."
  A barrier preventing the consumer from being satisfied with the fulfillment of his/her motivation, e.g. " but..."

The gap between the second and the third term offers a tension, which constitutes a potential for a brand. Like there are concept writers for copies, there are insight writers.

In technical terminology of insight in market research is the understanding of local market by referring different source of information (such as quantitative research and qualitative research) proving for the consumers' insight.

See also

 Human self-reflection
 Introspection
 Psychological mindedness
 Self awareness
 Bernard Lonergan
 Sagacity
 Christian ethics
 Virtue ethics

References

Further reading
 Bradley, Nigel, (2007), Marketing Research: Tools and Techniques, Oxford: Oxford University Press.

External links

 

Critical thinking
Concepts in epistemology
Sources of knowledge